The 2022 Wimbledon championships of tennis featured the 31st edition of the gentlemen's invitational doubles event, an exhibition event pitting former professional tennis players against one another.

Frenchmen Arnaud Clément and Michaël Llodra were the defending champions, but were eliminated in the round robin competition.

Bob and Mike Bryan won the title, defeating Xavier Malisse and Marcos Baghdatis in the final, 6–3, 6–4.

Format
Sixteen former professional tennis players competed in a round-robin stage in pairs of two distributed over two groups. The winners of each group faced each other in the final.

Draw

Final

Group A

Group B

References
Gentlemen's Invitation Doubles

Gentlemen's Invitation Doubles